This was the first edition of the tournament.

Seeds

  Alisa Kleybanova (first round)
  Tamarine Tanasugarn (second round)
  Monica Niculescu (final)
  Petra Kvitová (withdrew)
  Chan Yung-Jan (second round)
  Anne Keothavong (champion)
  Barbora Záhlavová-Strýcová (Quarterfinal)
  Elena Vesnina (second round)

Draw

Finals

Top half

Bottom half

References

Sources
Main Draw

Salwator Cup
WSG Open